The 5 cm KwK 38 L/42 (5 cm Kampfwagenkanone 38 L/42) was a German 50 mm calibre cannon used as the main armament of variants of the German Sd.Kfz. 141 Panzerkampfwagen III medium tank during the Second World War. (The towed anti-tank gun equivalent was the PaK.37 of which 2,600 were produced from 1937 until 1940).

History

The Panzer III was intended to fight other tanks; in the initial design stage a  gun was specified. However, the infantry at the time were being equipped with the  PaK 36, and it was thought that, in the interest of standardization, the tanks should carry the same armament. As a compromise, the turret ring was made large enough to accommodate a  gun should a future upgrade be required. This single decision later assured the Panzer III a prolonged life in the German Army.

The early Panzer III Ausf. A to early Ausf. G were equipped with a 3.7 cm KwK 36 L/45, which proved adequate during the campaigns of 1939 and 1940. In response to increasingly better armed and armored opponents, the later Panzer III Ausf. F to Ausf. J were upgraded with the 5 cm KwK 38 L/42. And the later Panzer III Ausf. J¹ to M went with the longer 5 cm KwK 39 L/60 gun.

Ammunition
Average penetration performance established against rolled homogenous steel armour plate laid back at 30° from the vertical.

PzGr (Armour Piercing)
 Weight of projectile:  
 Muzzle velocity:  

PzGr. 39 (Armour-piercing, capped, ballistic cap)
 Weight of projectile: 2.06 kg 
 Muzzle velocity: 685 m/s 

PzGr. 40 (Armour-piercing, composite, rigid)
 Weight of projectile:  
 Muzzle velocity:

Vehicles mounted on
 Panzerkampfwagen III (Sd. Kfz. 141) - Ausf. F to J (serial production), several earlier models were re-equipped with this gun.
 VK 20 series proposed replacement of the Panzer III and IV

See also
5 cm KwK 39

Weapons of comparable role, performance and era
 Ordnance QF 2-pounder: British 40mm tank and anti-tank gun
 45 mm anti-tank gun M1932 (19-K): Soviet tank gun 
 37 mm gun M3: US  tank gun

References

Citations

Bibliography
 

Tank guns of Germany
World War II artillery of Germany
50 mm artillery
World War II tank guns
Military equipment introduced from 1940 to 1944